The North Shore Rugby Football Club is a rugby union club based in Devonport, New Zealand. The club is a member of the North Harbour Rugby Union. Until 1985, with the creation of the North Harbour union, North Shore was a member of the Auckland Rugby Football Union.

History
The club was established in May 1873, making North Shore the oldest club in Auckland and one of the oldest in New Zealand. The club has been based at Devonport Domain since the early twentieth century and adopted its current green and white hoops in 1935. The club won the Auckland championship on one occasion, in 1899, and has won the North Harbour championship on seven occasions.

Honours

Auckland Championships (1): 1899

North Harbour Premiership Winners (7):1987, 1988, 1992, 2001, 2011, 2014, 2021

North Harbour Reserve Grade Winners (13):1986, 1987, 1989, 1998, 2000, 2002, 2006, 2008, 2010, 2012, 2014, 2016, 2019

North Harbour Under 21 Winners (4):1994, 1998, 2009, 2010)

Notable players

Stuart Krohn (born 1962), professional rugby union player
Buck Shelford (born 1957)
Brad Johnstone (born 1950)
Frano Botica (born 1963) 
Ben Botica (born 1989)
Jacob Botica (born 1993)

References

External links
Club website

New Zealand rugby union teams
Rugby clubs established in 1873